Daniel Rosas Reyes (born September 18, 1989) is a Mexican professional boxer.

Pro career
In February 2010, Rosas beat the undefeated Juan Carlos Sanchez, Jr. by T.K.O. to win the WBC CABOFE Super Flyweight Championship. The bout was the main-event of a boxing card at the Complejo Panamericano in Guadalajara, Jalisco, Mexico.

In December 2010, Rosas beat the undefeated Felipe Orucuta by UD to win "Campeon Azteca Tecate".

Professional Record 

| style="text-align:center;" colspan="8"|17 Wins (11 Knockouts, 6 Decisions), 2 Losses, 1 Draw
|-style="text-align:center; background:#e3e3e3;"
|style="border-style:none none solid solid; "|Res.
|style="border-style:none none solid solid; "|Record
|style="border-style:none none solid solid; "|Opponent
|style="border-style:none none solid solid; "|Type
|style="border-style:none none solid solid; "|Round
|style="border-style:none none solid solid; "|Date
|style="border-style:none none solid solid; "|Location
|style="border-style:none none solid solid; "|Notes
|-
|Loss
|17-2-1
|align=left| Alejandro Hernandez	
|
|
|
|align=left|
|align=left|
|- align=center
|Loss
|17-1-1
|align=left| Rodrigo Guerrero
|
|
|
|align=left|
|align=left|
|- align=center
|Win
|17-0-1
|align=left| Juan Alberto Rosas
|
|
|
|align=left|
|align=left|
|- align=center
|Win
|16-0-1
|align=left| Roberto Castaneda
|
|
|
|align=left|
|align=left|
|- align=center
|Win
|15-0-1
|align=left| Eduardo Garcia
|
|
|
|align=left|
|align=left|
|- align=center
|Win
|14-0-1
|align=left| Enrique Bernache
|
|
|
|align=left|
|align=left|
|- align=center
|Win
|13-0-1
|align=left| Fernando Vargas
|
|
|
|align=left|
|align=left|
|- align=center
|Draw
|12-0-1
|align=left| Jose Cabrera
|
|
|
|align=left|
|align=left|
|- align=center
|Win
|12-0
|align=left| Federico Catubay
|
|
|
|align=left|
|align=left|
|- align=center
|Win
|11-0
|align=left| David Gaspar
|
|
|
|align=left|
|align=left|
|- align=center
|Win
|10-0
|align=left| Felipe Orucuta
|
|
|
|align=left|
|align=left|
|- align=center
|Win
|9-0
|align=left| Mario Macias
|
|
|
|align=left|
|align=left|
|- align=center
|Win
|8-0
|align=left| Luis Valdez
|
|
|
|align=left|
|align=left|
|- align=center
|Win
|7-0
|align=left| Gabriel Aguillon
|
|
|
|align=left|
|align=left|
|- align=center
|Win
|6-0
|align=left| Juan Carlos Sanchez, Jr.
|
|
|
|align=left|
|align=left|
|- align=center
|Win
|5-0
|align=left| Carlos Jimenez
|
|
|
|align=left|
|align=left|
|- align=center
|Win
|4-0
|align=left| Juan Bernal
|
|
|
|align=left|
|align=left|
|- align=center
|Win
|3-0
|align=left| Carlos Mendoza Diaz
|
|
|
|align=left|
|align=left|
|- align=center
|Win
|2-0
|align=left| Jorge Juarez
|
|
|
|align=left|
|align=left|
|- align=center
|Win
|1-0
|align=left| David Ramirez
|
|
|
|align=left|
|align=left|

References

External links

Boxers from Mexico City
Bantamweight boxers
1989 births
Living people
Mexican male boxers